Panelle (or panelle di ceci) are Sicilian fritters made from chickpea flour and other ingredients, usually including water, salt, pepper, olive oil, and finely chopped parsley. They are a popular street food in Palermo and are often eaten between slices of bread or on a sesame roll, like a sandwich. These sandwiches, called pane e panelle, are usually served with a slice of lemon to be squeezed over the panelle. 

Panelle are made by mixing chickpea flour with water, salt, pepper, and olive oil, then whisking over heat until a thick dough is formed. Parsley is mixed into the dough and the mixture is either spread on an oiled baking sheet or put in an oiled container to cool and set. Once cool, the dough is cut into slices and fried. The panelle can be eaten fresh and hot, or cooled to room temperature. 

Some sources claim that these fritters originated with the Arab rulers of Sicily between the 9th and 11th century, although this appears to be unsupported by historical documentation. 

Panelle are very similar to the panisse of Nice.

These sandwiches have become very popular among Sicilian Americans in Brooklyn, New York, specifically in Gravesend, Brooklyn and Bensonhurst, Brooklyn. In Brooklyn, panelle are commonly used in sandwiches with ricotta added to them on vastedda. They are also popular among the Sicilian American community in Chicago's northwest suburbs, particularly around Niles and Des Plaines. 

They are sometimes called paneddi in Sicilian. The Italian singular of panelle is panella, a single fritter.

See also

Burmese tofu
Crocchè
Falafel
Farinata
List of Sicilian dishes
Pakora

References

External links
Panella page
Panella page 

Cuisine of Sicily
Legume dishes
Cuisine of New York City
Italian-American culture in New York City
Sicilian-American culture